International Animated Film Festival may refer to:
Annecy International Animated Film Festival
Hiroshima International Animation Festival
Kalamazoo Animation Festival International
KROK International Animated Films Festival
Melbourne International Animation Festival
Ottawa International Animation Festival
Red Stick International Animation Festival

It may also refer to:
International Comics and Animation Festival
Dok Leipzig

See also:
List of major animation festivals